Luoxiu Road is a metro station on the Line 15 of the Shanghai Metro. Located at the intersection of Laohumin Road and Luoxiu Road in Xuhui District, Shanghai, the station was scheduled to open with the rest of Line 15 by the end of 2020. However, the station eventually opened on 23 January 2021 following a one-month postponement.

References 

Railway stations in Shanghai
Shanghai Metro stations in Xuhui District
Line 15, Shanghai Metro
Railway stations in China opened in 2021